Danir AB is a Swedish holding company for the Olofsson family investments. Danir owns, manages and actively participates in developing listed and unlisted companies, mainly within development-intensive business sectors. The core holdings and portfolio companies are characterised by sharing Danir's view on entrepreneurship and commitment to creating long-term value growth.
Danir was founded in 1986 by Swedish IT entrepreneur Dan Olofsson. Danir's HQ is located in Malmö, Sweden. Johan Glennmo is Chairman of the Board.

Holdings
Danir’s ownership interests consist of core holdings in which Danir has subsidiaries and a long-term view of ownership. The main business is consulting companies that focus on supporting customers in their digitalisation. This is run within the framework of Sigma, Nexer, A Society, and PION Group. 

Danir's ownership interests also consist of portfolio companies, in which Danir primarily is a venture capital contributor. In 2022, the Danir Group is expected to have a turnover of near SEK 13 billion.

Social responsibility
Danir is actively supporting Star for Life, a South African-based HIV/aids prevention initiative, and is involved in a number of projects that in different ways aim to improve conditions for achieving positive developments in society. This involvement focuses on Malmö and Sweden, as well as poorer parts of the world.

References
Danir's official site

Holding companies of Sweden
Companies based in Malmö